Look Up is a studio album by American singer-songwriter Bob Neuwirth. It was released on 19 March 1996 by Watermelon Records, and it is his first solo album since 1991's 99 Monkeys. Neuwirth on this album worked with several musicians including Patti Smith and Elliott Murphy.

Track listing
All tracks composed by Bob Neuwirth; except where indicated
"Blue Detour" – 3:09
"I Don't Think of Her" – 4:03
"What's Our Love Coming To" (Billy Swan, Bob Neuwirth) – 2:40
"Lucky Too" – 3:46
"Beyond The Blues" (Bob Neuwirth, Peter Case, Tom Russell) – 3:39
"Nashville" (Bob Neuwirth, Sandy Bull) – 2:24
"Gonna Lay Down My Old Guitar" (Alton Delmore, Rabon Delmore) – 4:03
"Everybody's Got a Job to Do" (Bob Neuwirth, Peter Case) – 3:40
"Heroes" – 5:44
"Traveling Light" (Bob Neuwirth, Peter Case) – 3:46
"Sweet and Shiny Eyes" (Nan O'Byrne) – 2:29
"Cloudy Day" – 3:58
"Just Like You" (Bob Neuwirth, Patti Smith) – 2:59
"Beautiful Day" – 4:02
"Save Me Jesus" (Bobby Charles) – 4:32
"(Gilbert Says Hello)" – 0:53

Personnel
Bob Neuwirth – vocals, guitar, mandolin
Gary Lucas – guitar
John Cooke – guitar, vocals
Peter Case – guitar, harmonica, vocals
Elliott Murphy – guitar, harmonica, vocals
Butch Hancock – guitar, harmonica, vocals, photography
Billy Swan – guitar
Chuck Prophet – guitar
Bernie Leadon – guitar, bass, mandolin, tambourine
Debbie Green – bass
David Mansfield – bass, slide guitar, fiddle
Steven Soles – bass, background vocals
Don Heffington – drums
Mickey Raphael – harmonica
Matt Cartsonis – mandolin
Sandy Bull – pedal steel guitar, guitar, bass
Gilbert Shelton – piano, cover illustration
Bruce Langthorne – piano
Gurf Morlix – slide guitar
Charlie Sexton – vocals, violin, mandocello, drum
Matt Cartsonis – accordion
Ned Albright – background vocals
Andrew Williams – vocals
Cindy Bullens – vocals
David Williams – vocals
Mark Olsen – vocals
Patti Smith – vocals
Rosie Flores – vocals
Victoria Williams – vocals
Heinz Geissler, John Kunz - executive production
Dick Reeves, Scott Smith - art direction and design

References

Bob Neuwirth albums
1996 albums
Albums produced by Bob Neuwirth